Dark Ages reenactment is generally considered a sub-branch of Medieval reenactment focussing on the 1st millennium AD beginning with the fall of the Western Roman Empire and ending with the High Middle Ages.

The term 'Dark Ages' is much used. Some groups define it as the period between the collapse of the Western Roman Empire, and the establishment of the main European Christian kingdoms - approx. 400 - 750 AD, whereas others include the Viking period as well (extending as far as 1066 AD). Some people call the later half of this period "Early Medieval".

Most reenactment groups focus on a smaller time period, sometimes restricting their interest to a particular century, or even a specific decade, depending on how authentic the reenactment and encampment is intended to be. Typically Dark Ages reenactment groups focus on a specific time period and culture within this range, such as Vendel Age Vikings or the Picts.

The largest Dark Age event in the UK is the Battle of Hastings reenactment.

See also
Medieval reenactment
The Vikings (reenactment)
Regia Anglorum
Vikings Of Middle England

Medieval reenactment
Medieval-themed fairs by type